Floorball is a type of floor hockey with five players and a goalkeeper in each team. It is played indoors with  sticks and a  plastic ball with holes. Matches are played in three twenty-minute periods. The sport of bandy also played a role in the game's development.

The game was invented in Sweden in the late 1960s. The basic rules were established in 1979 when the first floorball club in the world, Sala IBK, from Sala, was founded in Sweden. Official rules for matches were first written down in 1981.

The sport is organized internationally by the International Floorball Federation (IFF). As of 2019, there were about 377,000 registered floorball players worldwide, up from around 300,000 in 2014. Events include an annual Champions Cup, EuroFloorball Cup and EuroFloorball Challenge for club teams and the biennial World Floorball Championships with separate divisions for men and women. Professional club leagues include Finland's F-liiga, Sweden's Svenska Superligan, Switzerland's Unihockey Prime League and the Czech Republic's Superliga florbalu.

While the IFF contains 75 members, floorball is most popular where it has been developed the longest, such as the Czech Republic, Denmark, Estonia, Finland, Latvia, Norway, Sweden, and Switzerland. It is gaining popularity in Australia, New Zealand, India, Canada, Germany, Ireland, Japan, Singapore, Malaysia, the United States, and the United Kingdom.

Floorball was included in the World Games for the first time in 2017 in Wrocław, Poland, where Sweden became the first team to win a gold medal.

Etymology 
The game of floorball is also known by many other names, such as saalihoki (In Estonia), salibandy (in Finland), innebandy (in Sweden and Norway), unihockey (in Switzerland and Ireland) and grindų riedulys (in Lithuania). The names "salibandy" and "innebandy" are derived from bandy; they translate to "hall bandy" and "indoor bandy" respectively. Unihockey is derived from "universal hockey" since it is meant to be a special and simplified hockey form.

In Sweden, voices have been raised to get rid of the word "innebandy" as name of the sport, to avoid confusions with bandy.

History 

In various forms the game of floor hockey has been played since the early 20th Century in Canada as a recreational sport, especially in high school gymnasiums, as a playful variant of hockey. The basic design of floorball sticks is believed to have come from the ice skating team sport of bandy.

By the 1950s and 1960s many public school systems within Michigan in the United States incorporated floorball into their primary and secondary school gym classes. Americans have since claimed to have invented floorball. American held interstate tournaments in the 1960s.

Floorball was formally organized as an international and more organized sport in the late 1970s in Gothenburg, Sweden. The sport began as something that was played for fun as a pastime in schools. After a decade or so, floorball began showing up in Nordic countries where the former schoolyard pastime was becoming a developed sport. Formal rules were soon developed, and clubs began to form. After some time, several countries developed national associations, and the IFF was founded in 1986.

Expansion 

When the IFF was founded in 1986, the sport was played mostly in the Nordic countries, several parts of the rest of Europe and Japan. By 1990, floorball was recognized in 7 countries, and by the time of the first European Floorball Championships in 1994, that number had risen to 14. That number included the United States, who was the first country outside Europe and Asia to recognize floorball. By the time of the first men's world championships in 1996, 20 nations played floorball, with 12 of them participating at the tournament.

As of 2009, the sport of floorball has been played in almost 80 countries. Of those, 58 have national floorball associations that are recognized by the IFF. With the addition of Sierra Leone, Africa's first floorball nation, the IFF has at least one national association on each continent of the world, with the exception of Antarctica.

Development 
10 years after the IFF was founded, the first world championships were played, with a sold out final of 15,106 people at the Globen in Stockholm, Sweden. In addition to that, the world's two largest floorball leagues, Finland's Salibandyliiga and Sweden's Svenska Superligan were formed, in 1986 and 1995 respectively.

Recognition 
In December 2008, the IFF and the sport of floorball received recognition from the International Olympic Committee (IOC). In July 2011, the IOC officially welcomed the IFF into its family of Recognised International Sports Federations (ARISF). This will pave the way for floorball to enter the official sport programme.  The IFF hoped that this recognition would help allow floorball to become a part of the 2020 Summer Olympics.

In January 2009, the IFF and the sport of floorball received recognition from the Special Olympics.

In addition to recognition by the IOC and Special Olympics, the IFF is also a member of the Global Association of International Sports Federations (GAISF, formerly SportAccord), and co-operates with the International University Sports Federation (FISU). Floorball is now also member of IWGA, which runs the World Games, and floorball was on the programme for the first time in Wrocław 2017.

World championships 

The world floorball championships are an annual event where teams from across the world gather to play in a tournament in order to win the world championship. As of 2011, eight Men's, eight Women's, six Men's Under-19, and four Women's Under-19 World Floorball Championships have taken place. The Czech Republic, Finland, Norway, Sweden, and Switzerland remain the only five countries to have ever captured a medal at a World Championship event.
 The Men's World Floorball Championship takes place every December (since 2008) in every even year.
 The Women's World Floorball Championship takes place every December (since 2009) in every odd year.
 The Men's under-19 World Floorball Championship takes place every May (since 2009) in every odd year.
 The Women's under-19 World Floorball Championships takes place every May (since 2008) in every even year.

From 1996 to 2009, the IFF used a World Floorball Championship format where the last team in the A-Division was relegated to the B-Division, while the top team in the B-Division was promoted to the A-Division. This format caused much hardship for countries such as Australia, Canada, Slovakia, and Spain, who have all been trying to get to the B-Division from the C-Division since 2004. In 2010, the IFF adopted a FIFA-like continental qualification system, where teams must qualify to play at the world championships. Depending on the number of countries registered per continent or region, the IFF gives spots for the world championships. For example, Argentina, Brazil, Canada and the United States would need to play for one spot at the world championships in a continental qualification tournament for the Americas.

Gameplay

Measurements 
Face-off dots are marked on the center line. Dots are also marked   from both sides of the rink on the goal lines imaginary extensions. The dots do not exceed  in diameter. They do not have to be dots, they can also be crosses.

Equipment 

Typical equipment for a floorball player consists of a stick, a pair of shorts, a shirt, socks, and indoor sport shoes.  Players may wear shin guards, eye protectors and protective padding for vital areas although most do not. Protective eyewear is, in some countries, compulsory for junior players.

A floorball stick is short compared with one for ice hockey; the maximum size for a stick is 114 cm. As a stick cannot weigh any more than 350 grams, floorball sticks are often made of carbon and composite materials. The blade of the stick can either be "right" or "left" which indicates which way stick is supposed to be held from the players point of view. A player who is right-handed will often use a "left" blade since this he/she will be holding the stick to left and the other way around for left-handed people.

Goalkeepers 
Goalkeepers wear limited protection provided by padded pants, a padded chest protector, knee pads and a helmet. Some goalkeepers like to wear gloves and/or wristbands The goalkeeper may also wear other protective equipment such as elbow pads and jock straps but bulky padding is not permitted. Goalkeepers do not use sticks and may use their hands to play the ball when they are within the goalkeeper's box. There, they are allowed to throw the ball out to their teammates provided that the ball touches the ground before the half court mark. When they are completely outside the box, goalkeepers are considered field players and are not allowed to touch the ball with their hands.

Ball 

Many of these balls now are made with aerodynamic technology, where the ball has over a thousand small dimples in it that reduce air resistance.

Rules 
Each team can field six players at a time on the court, one player being a goalkeeper. But the coach can take the goalkeeper off and substitute them for a field player whenever they like, although it usually only happens in the end to increase the chances of scoring with one more outfield player. This can bring an advantage for the attacking side of the team but also disadvantages when it comes to their own defense. Both teams are also allowed to change players any time in the game; usually, a change comprises the whole team. Individual substitution happens sometimes, but usually only when a player is exhausted or hurt.

A floorball game is officially played over three periods lasting 20 minutes each (15 minutes for juniors). The clock is stopped in the case of penalties, goals, time-outs and any situation where the ball is not considered to be in play. The signal of a timeout is a triple honking sound. An intermission of 10 minutes (or maximum 15 minutes in some competitions) takes place between each period, where teams change ends and substitution areas. Each team is allowed one timeout of 30 seconds, which is often used late in matches. There are two referees to oversee the game, each with equal authority. If a game ends in a tie, teams play ten minutes extra, and the team that scores first wins. If the game is still drawn after extra-time, a penalty shootout similar to ice-hockey decides the winner.

Checking is prohibited in floorball. Controlled shoulder-to-shoulder contact is allowed but ice hockey-like checking is forbidden. Pushing players without the ball or competing for a loose ball is also disallowed, and many of these infractions lead to two-minute penalties. The best comparison in terms of legal physical contact is Association football (soccer), where checking is used to improve one's positioning in relation to the ball rather than to remove an opposing player from the play. In addition to checking, players cannot lift an opponent's stick or perform any stick infractions in order to get to the ball. Moreover, players may not raise their stick or play the ball above knee level, and a stick may not be placed in between a player's legs. Passing the ball by foot is allowed, but only once. After that, the ball has to be moved with the stick. After stopping the ball by foot the ball has to be touched with the stick before it can be passed to a teammate by foot (Rule change 2014). Passing by hand or head deliberately may result in a two minutes penalty for the offending player. A field player may not enter the marked goal area and playing without stick is prohibited.

When a player commits a foul or when the ball is deemed unplayable, play is resumed from a free hit or a face-off. A free hit means that a player from one of the teams restarts the play from the place where the ball was last deemed unplayable. A comparable situation to this is a free kick in association football. For many fouls, such as stick infractions, a free hit is the only disciplinary action prescribed. However, at their own discretion the referee may additionally award a two or five minute penalty to the offending player. In that case, the player who committed the foul has to leave the field and sit out his punishment in a dedicated penalty area, leaving his team shorthanded for the time of the penalty. If an 'extreme' foul is committed, such as physical contact or unsportsmanlike conduct, a player may receive a 10-minute personal penalty.

Penalties 
Two-minute penalties can arise from a number of infractions and result in the offending player being sat on a penalty seat next to the scorers/timekeepers and away from the team benches. Each penalty has a specific code that is recorded on the official match record along with the time of the foul. The team of the offending player will play short-handed for the full length of the penalty. The codes are as follows;

Two Minute Penalties
 201: Hit
 202: Blocking Stick
 203: Lifting Stick
 204: Incorrect Kick
 205: High Kick
 206: High Stick
 207: Incorrect Push
 208: Tackle/Trip
 209: Holding
 210: Obstruction
 211: Incorrect Distance
 212: Lying Play
 213: Hands
 214: Header
 215: Incorrect Substitution
 216: Too Many Players
 217: Repeated Offences
 218: Delaying
 219: Protest
 220: Incorrect Entering of the Rink
 221: Incorrect Equipment
 222: Measuring Stick
 223: Incorrect Numbering
 224: Play without Stick
 225: Non-removal of Broken Stick
 226: Penalty at Penalty Shot

5 Minute Penalties
 501: Violent Hit
 502: Dangerous Play
 503: Hooking
 504: Roughing
 505: Repeated Offences

Personal Fouls/Penalties
 101: Unsportsman-like Conduct

Forms

Freebandy 
Freebandy is a sport that developed in the 2000s from floorball fanatics who specialize in a technique called "zorro", which involves lifting the ball onto a stick and allowing air resistance and fast movements to keep the ball "stuck" to the stick. This technique is also referred to as "airhooking" or "skyhooking". In freebandy, the rules are very much the same of those of floorball, with the exception of high nets and no infractions for high sticking. As well, the sticks are slightly tweaked from those of a floorball variety to include a "pocket" where the ball can be placed.

Special Olympics 
Floorball at the Special Olympics is slightly modified from the "regular" form of floorball. This form of floorball was developed for the intellectually disabled, and has yet to be played at the Special Olympics. Floorball was played as a demonstration sport at the 2013 Special Olympics World Winter Games, and was played as an official sport at the games in 2017.

Streetbandy 
A simplified less formal version of floorball, played with smaller team numbers and shorter periods, and typically outdoors on various surfaces, including AstroTurf. In its most basic form, it is an informal pick up game amongst friends. However, a more formal version is played in Sweden, with the following structure:
 three field players on each team, with smaller overall team sizes (including subs.)
 small goals, with no goalie
 smaller playing area, usually closer to a half rink.
 10-minute length.
 tendency towards "first team to score 5 goals in the time limit" rather than traditional scoring. Sudden death on a draw.
 penalties are taken from the centre line.
 most situations arising from the ball leaving play are resumed from a fixed point (e.g. corner, centre line)
 no physical contact, high sticks or dangerous activity allowed.

Swiss floorball 
Swiss floorball called unihockey is a revised version of a floorball match. The match is played on a slightly smaller court and often involves only three field players playing on each side, in 3-on-3 floorball. This form of floorball is also slightly shorter, with only two periods of 15 to 20 minutes each played. In Switzerland this form of playing is called "smallcourt" (Kleinfeld), opposed to the usual style of playing on a bigger court, which is called "bigcourt" (Grossfeld).

Wheelchair floorball 
Originally developed for players with disabilities, wheelchair floorball is played with exactly the same rules as "regular" floorball. Players use the same stick and ball, and goaltenders are also allowed to play.

The first ever IFF-sanctioned wheelchair floorball matches were played between the men's teams of the Czech Republic and Sweden during the 2008 Men's World Floorball Championships in Prague.

In addition to this, there is also an electric wheelchair variation.

Competitions 

In addition to the Floorball World Championships, there are other IFF Events for club teams such as the Champions Cup which is for the national competition winners from the Top-4 ranked nations, and the EuroFloorball Cup for the national competition winners from the 5th and lower ranked nations. There are also many international floorball club competitions.

Asia Pacific Floorball Championship 

The Asia Pacific Floorball Championships are played every single year in New Zealand, Australia, Singapore, or Japan. The event was created by the Singapore Floorball Association together with the cooperation of the Asia Oceania Floorball Confederation (AOFC). Members of the AOFC get together during this tournament to play for the Asia Pacific Floorball Championship every year.

As of 2010, the Asia Pacific Floorball Championship is also the qualifying tournament for the World Floorball Championships.

Canada Cup 

The Canada Cup is an international club tournament that is held every year in Toronto, Ontario, Canada. It is the largest floorball club tournament outside of Europe, and attracts 55+ clubs from worldwide, every year.

Czech Open 

The world's largest club team tournament, the Czech Open is a traditional summer tournament held in Prague, Czech Republic. It is famous not only for its on-court activities, but also for those off-court. The tournament attracts 200+ clubs every year from 20 countries.

Champions Cup 

The Champions Cup was played for the first time in 2011. It is now the premier IFF event for Men's and Women's Club teams. The national championship winners from the Top-4 ranked nations compete in the event.

EuroFloorball Cup 
The EuroFloorball Cup (formerly European Cup) is an IFF-organised club event for both men's and women's teams. It has taken place every single year since 1993, and in 2000 it changed its format to a 2-year event (i.e. 2000–01). In 2008, the tournament switched back to its one-year format. In 2011 it underwent another change when the Champions Cup was introduced for the first time.

The EuroFloorball Cup (EFC) is now for the national competition winners from the 5th and lower ranked nations. Qualification can be made via a number of processes. Firstly, the teams from the 5th, 6th & 7th ranked nations receive automatic qualification. A team nominated by the local event organiser also gets automatic qualification, and then the last two spots are determined by qualification tournaments.

North American Floorball League 

The North American Floorball League is the first and only semi professional floorball league outside of Europe. It is not affiliated with any federation, so it has players from around the world. The inaugural set of teams are entirely based in the United States, though there is potential for expansion into Canada.

See also 
 Indoor hockey
 Field hockey

Notes and references

External links 

 International Floorball Federation

 
Team sports
Indoor sports
Ball games
Variations of hockey
Sports originating in Sweden
Mixed-sex sports
Stick sports